Lois Jane Simpson (born 11 June 1961) is a New Zealand former cricketer and field hockey player. In cricket, she played as a right-handed batter and appeared in 1 Test match and 12 One Day Internationals for New Zealand between 1985 and 1988. She played domestic cricket for Auckland and North Shore. In hockey, she appeared six times for New Zealand.

References

External links

1961 births
Living people
People from Feilding
New Zealand women cricketers
New Zealand women Test cricketers
New Zealand women One Day International cricketers
Auckland Hearts cricketers
North Shore women cricketers